"Ilariê" is a song recorded by the Brazilian singer Xuxa, released on June 30, 1988 by Som Livre as the lead single from her fourth studio album, Xou da Xuxa 3 (1988). "Ilariê" debuted at the top of the Brazilian radio stations, reigning for 20 consecutive weeks.

Ilariê's success has made Xou da Xuxa 3, the second best-selling album in the history of Brazil, with more than 3 million copies, entering the Guinness World Records as the best-selling children's album in history. The song was recorded in 80 dialects, including a Chinese version recorded by Taiwanese girl group i.n.g.

In addition, the song achieved international success, when it was released outside Brazil in 1989, reaching position #11 on the Billboard's Hot Latin Songs chart.

Charts

References

Brazilian songs
Children's songs
1988 singles
1988 songs
Xuxa songs
Number-one singles in Brazil